Amphineurus is a genus of crane fly in the family Limoniidae.

Species
Subgenus Amphineurus Skuse, 1890
A. bicinctus Edwards, 1923
A. bickeli Theischinger, 1996
A. bicorniger Alexander, 1924
A. breviclavus Alexander, 1924
A. campbelli Alexander, 1922
A. castroensis Alexander, 1929
A. collessi Theischinger, 1994
A. cyathetanus Alexander, 1952
A. fergusoni Alexander, 1931
A. flexuosus Alexander, 1923
A. hudsoni Edwards, 1923
A. kandu Theischinger, 1994
A. kingi Alexander, 1950
A. koghiensis Hynes, 1993
A. leaski Theischinger, 1996
A. longipes (Philippi, 1866)
A. lyriformis Alexander, 1923
A. maculosus (Skuse, 1890)
A. minor Alexander, 1923
A. minusculus Alexander, 1921
A. molophilinus Alexander, 1922
A. monteithi Theischinger, 1994
A. nox Alexander, 1922
A. operculatus Alexander, 1924
A. patya Theischinger, 1994
A. perarmatus Alexander, 1924
A. perdecorus Edwards, 1923
A. pita Theischinger, 1994
A. polycyclus Alexander, 1961
A. pressus Alexander, 1922
A. pulchripes Alexander, 1925
A. pullybuntor Theischinger, 1994
A. senex Alexander, 1922
A. spectabilis Theischinger, 1996
A. stewartiae Alexander, 1924
A. subdecorus Edwards, 1924
A. submolophilinus Alexander, 1923
A. superbus Theischinger, 1996
A. tenuipollex Alexander, 1952
A. tumidus Alexander, 1923
A. umbraticus (Skuse, 1890)
A. zborowskii Theischinger, 1996
Subgenus Nesormosia Alexander, 1923
A. fatuus (Hutton, 1902)
A. niveinervis Edwards, 1923
A. ochroplaca Alexander, 1925
A. subfatuus Alexander, 1922
Subgenus Nothormosia Alexander, 1923
A. blackballensis Alexander, 1953
A. cacoxenus Alexander, 1925
A. edentulus Alexander, 1939
A. fimbriatulus Alexander, 1925
A. gracilisentis Alexander, 1922
A. harrisi Alexander, 1922
A. hastatus Alexander, 1925
A. horni Edwards, 1923
A. insulsus (Hutton, 1902)
A. longi Alexander, 1950
A. meridionalis Alexander, 1924
A. nothofagi Alexander, 1925
A. otagensis Alexander, 1922
A. patruelis Alexander, 1925
A. recurvans Alexander, 1922
A. spinulistylus Alexander, 1925
A. subglaber Edwards, 1923
A. tortuosus Alexander, 1923
Subgenus Rhamphoneurus Alexander, 1929
A. alexanderi Santos, Santos & Ribeiro, 2022
A. amorimi Santos, Santos & Ribeiro, 2022
A. anchoralis Santos, Santos & Ribeiro, 2022
A. anfractus Santos, Santos & Ribeiro, 2022
A. apiculatus Alexander, 1968
A. billinghami Santos, Santos & Ribeiro, 2022
A. caleuchus Santos, Santos & Ribeiro, 2022
A. chiloeanus Alexander, 1969
A. deceptus Santos, Santos & Ribeiro, 2022
A. extraordinarius Alexander, 1939
A. falcatus Santos, Santos & Ribeiro, 2022
A. glabristylatus Alexander, 1929
A. immaculatus Santos, Santos & Ribeiro, 2022
A. insanus Alexander, 1952
A. morphyi Santos, Santos & Ribeiro, 2022
A. nonnullus Alexander, 1967
A. nothofagetorum Alexander, 1929
A. nullus Alexander, 1967
A. oosterbroeki Santos, Santos & Ribeiro, 2022
A. podenasi Santos, Santos & Ribeiro, 2022
A. rutristylus Alexander, 1968
A. sanus Alexander, 1929
A. stigmaticus Santos, Santos & Ribeiro, 2022
A. theischingeri Santos, Santos & Ribeiro, 2022
A. triangularis Santos, Santos & Ribeiro, 2022

References

Limoniidae
Tipuloidea genera